Jamileh is a female given name. It means "beautiful". Notable people with the given name include: 
 Jamileh, Iranian dancer
 Jamileh Kadivar, Iranian politician
Jamileh Sadeghi (born 1958), Iranian businesswoman
 Jamileh Sheykhi (1930–2001), Iranian actress
 Jamileh Sorouri (born 1950), Iranian gymnast
 May J., Japanese singer

See also
 Jamila
 Jamill

References

Iranian feminine given names